Lake Stickney is a census-designated place (CDP) in Snohomish County, Washington, United States. The population was 15,413 at the 2020 census. The CDP was known as Paine Field-Lake Stickney prior to 2010. The new Lake Stickney CDP no longer contains the Paine Field airport.

Geography
Lake Stickney is located at  (47.871429, -122.257204).

According to the United States Census Bureau, the CDP has a total area of 1.6 square miles (4.1 km2), of which, 1.5 square miles (4.0 km2) of it is land and 0.04 square miles (0.1 km2) of it (2.43%) is water.

Demographics
As of the census of 2000, there were 24,383 people, 9,978 households, and 5,896 families residing in the CDP. The population density was 3,307.0 people per square mile (1,277.4/km2). There were 10,703 housing units at an average density of 1,451.6/sq mi (560.7/km2). The racial makeup of the CDP was 62.24% White, 9.92% African American, 1.28% Native American, 7.37% Asian, 0.50% Pacific Islander, 7.26% from other races, and 4.44% from two or more races. Hispanic or Latino of any race were 17.47% of the population.

There were 9,978 households, out of which 33.3% had children under the age of 18 living with them, 40.1% were married couples living together, 13.2% had a female householder with no husband present, and 40.9% were non-families. 30.4% of all households were made up of individuals, and 6.9% had someone living alone who was 65 years of age or older. The average household size was 2.43 and the average family size was 3.06.

In the CDP, the age distribution of the population shows 26.5% under the age of 18, 12.1% from 18 to 24, 36.6% from 25 to 44, 17.2% from 45 to 64, and 7.6% who were 65 years of age or older. The median age was 31 years. For every 100 females, there were 102.2 males. For every 100 females age 18 and over, there were 100.4 males.

The median income for a household in the CDP was $40,831, and the median income for a family was $44,378. Males had a median income of $35,204 versus $27,095 for females. The per capita income for the CDP was $19,801. About 8.4% of families and 11.0% of the population were below the poverty line, including 13.6% of those under age 18 and 12.0% of those age 65 or over.

See also
 Western Air Defense Force (Air Defense Command)

References

Census-designated places in Snohomish County, Washington
Census-designated places in Washington (state)